Liberec Region is an administrative unit (Czech: kraj) of the Czech Republic, located in the northernmost part of its historical region of Bohemia. It is named after its capital Liberec. The region shares international borders with Germany and Poland. Domestically the region borders the Ústí nad Labem Region to the west, the Central Bohemian Region to the south and the Hradec Králové Region to the east.

Administrative divisions
The Liberec Region is divided into 4 districts:

At a lower level, the region has 215 municipalities, comprising 65 in the Semily District, 59 in the Jablonec nad Nisou District, 57 in the Česká Lípa District and 34 in the Liberec District.

Cities and towns
The table below gives an overview of towns and cities in the region that have at least 7,000 inhabitants (as of 1 January 2019).

Physical geography
The region's landscape includes the Jizera Mountains, part of the Krkonoše Mountains and part of the Lusatian Mountains.

The region was affected by flash floods in August 2010, with swelling of the river Smědá being one of the factors to prompt evacuation efforts in the region.

Demography
As of 1 January 2019, the population of the Liberec Region was 442,356 with 217,791 men and 224,565 women, accounting for 49.2% and 50.8% of the population respectively.

Economy
The Liberec Region hosts manufacturing, glassmaking, mechanical engineering and jewellery production industries among others. The region is part of the so-called Black Triangle, an area of heavy industrialization and environmental damage on the three-way border of Poland, Germany, and the Czech Republic.

Culture

The Liberec Region is home to 11 national cultural monuments including Bezděz Castle, Dlaskův statek in Dolánky u Turnova and the Ještěd Tower which transmits television signals as well as being a hotel. 2013 saw the proposal of an additional two sites to the list, those being a glass grinding plant in Harrachov dating from 1895 and the Janatův Mlýn watermill in Buřany, Jablonec nad Jizerou part of which remains from 1767.

A Neolithic site dating to around 4,500 BC was uncovered in 2007 near the village of Příšovice.

Lake Mácha near the town of Doksy is an important regional centre for leisure, attracting around 30,000 visitors annually. The vicinity of the lake has a caravan park and hosts an annual music festival called , which was attended by approximately 8,000 people in 2013.

Since the region was for a long time part of the Holy Roman Empire, and later (in 1938–1945) the major part of the reagion was a part of Germany as part of Sudetenland, the local buildings and the culture in general have been influenced by the Germans, also considering the fact that parts of the region were populated by a majority of Sudeten Germans, prior to their expulsion after World War II.

Transport
The region is linked to Prague by the D10 motorway, which terminates in the town of Turnov. Three airports are in the region; Hradčany Airport, a disused military airport near the town of Ralsko, is the most significant. Other minor airports exist in Česká Lípa and Hodkovice nad Mohelkou.

Education
The region is home to the public Technical University of Liberec, which was founded in 1953. The university, which originally specialized in Mechanical and Textile Engineering, added a further four faculties in the 1990s, namely those specialising in Education, Economy, Architecture and Mechatronics.

References

External links

 
Regions of the Czech Republic